Limber may refer to:

 Limber, a song off the album Aneurythm by the American hard rock band Living Syndication.
 Limber, a Puerto Rican frozen ice pop made in different flavors, supposedly named after aviator Charles Lindbergh.
 Limber in limbers and caissons, a cart used for supporting an artillery piece in transit
Limber hole, a type of drain hole in ships
Limber Pine, a species of pine tree found in the Western United States and Canada
Limber Perez, a Honduran football player
Limber Trail, a trail at Shenandoah National Park
Limber, in Africa is happiness term